Ernst Kalwitzki (3 October 1909 – 3 February 1991) was a German footballer who played as a right winger. He played from 1933 until 1943 for FC Schalke 04. He won six German championships and one national cup with the club. In the 1939 German championship final, he scored five goals in Schalke's 9–0 victory over Admira Vienna.

Honours 
Schalke 04
German Championship: 1934, 1935, 1937, 1939, 1940, 1942
German Cup: 1937

References

External links
 

1909 births
1991 deaths
Sportspeople from Gelsenkirchen
German footballers
Association football forwards
FC Schalke 04 players
Footballers from North Rhine-Westphalia